Giltbrook Viaduct was a railway viaduct built in the Erewash Valley between Awsworth and Giltbrook in Nottinghamshire.

It was demolished in 1973 to make way for the A610 bypass.

Origins
The viaduct was built between May 1873 and November 1875 and forms part of the Great Northern Railway Derbyshire Extension which was built in part to exploit the coalfields in Derbyshire and Nottinghamshire. The contract was given by the Great Northern Railway (GNR) to Joseph Firbank with the line laid out by, and the viaduct designed by Richard Johnson (Chief Civil Engineer of the GNR); Samuel Abbott was the resident engineer.

At Awsworth Junction the railway branched, one line passed over the Bennerley Viaduct, the other turned North towards Pinxton crossing the Giltbrook Viaduct (or Kimberley Viaduct but known locally as Forty Bridges). 

The viaduct was S-shaped and built in four sections. The second section consisted of one  skew span arch over the Midland Railway's Bulwell to Bennerley branch line followed by 15 arches each spanning . Each section was separated by stop piers. To the South West of the viaduct next to the Nottingham Canal arm was a Nottingham Gas Light and Coke Company chemical works of which Thomas Hawksley was once the managing engineer.

Great Midlands Raid
Houses were built into arches 8 and 23 counting from the Awsworth end. These dwellings were used as makeshift air raid shelters by school children from Awsworth during a First World war German Zeppelin Airship bombing raid which dropped bombs at Bennerley Junction. This bombing raid was part of what became known as the Great Midlands Raid.

References

Further reading

External links

Railway viaducts in Nottinghamshire
Arch bridges
Skew bridges
Brick bridges
Demolished bridges in England
Bridges completed in 1875
Buildings and structures demolished in 1973
Great Northern Railway (Great Britain)